Vendor finance is a form of lending in which a company lends money to be used by the borrower to buy the vendor's products or property. Vendor finance is usually in the form of deferred loans from, or shares subscribed by, the vendor. The vendor often takes shares in the borrowing company. This category of finance is generally used where the vendor's expectation of the value of the business is higher than that of the borrower's bankers, and usually at a higher interest rate than would be offered elsewhere.it is a cheaper option than going to banks. 

Vendor finance bridges the valuation gap due to the time value of money. If the buyer of a business doesn't have to repay the vendor for the vendor loan for a few years, then the value of that portion of the purchase price is worthless. In some cases there is an interest charge on vendor loan, but in other cases it is simply a deferred payment. Vendor finance is different from an Earnout because it is not contingent on performance. Since there is no contingency, vendor finance is more risky for the buyer than an earn-out.

Vendor finance can also be used when the buyer does not have the funds to purchase the entire business. In this case the vendor creates a loan with an interest charge to help the buyer complete the purchase and help the seller complete the sale, usually on better terms for the seller.

See also 
 Hire purchase
 Tied aid

Credit
Financial economics